James Gombedza (born 11 April 1962) is a Zimbabwean long-distance runner. He competed in the men's marathon at the 1988 Summer Olympics.

References

1962 births
Living people
Athletes (track and field) at the 1988 Summer Olympics
Zimbabwean male long-distance runners
Zimbabwean male marathon runners
Olympic athletes of Zimbabwe
Athletes (track and field) at the 1994 Commonwealth Games
Commonwealth Games competitors for Zimbabwe
Place of birth missing (living people)